The Songhai Empire (also transliterated as Songhay) was a state that dominated the western Sahel/Sudan in the 15th and 16th century. At its peak, it was one of the largest states in African history. The state is known by its historiographical name, derived from its leading ethnic group and ruling elite, the Songhai. Sonni Ali established Gao as the capital of the empire although a Songhai state had existed in and around Gao since the 11th century. Other important cities in the empire were Timbuktu and Djenné, conquered in 1468 and 1475 respectively, where urban-centered trade flourished and to the south is the north Akan state of Bonoman. Initially, the empire was ruled by the Sonni dynasty (–1493), but it was later replaced by the Askia dynasty (1493–1901).

During the second half of the 13th century, Gao and the surrounding region had grown into an important trading center and attracted the interest of the expanding Mali Empire. Mali conquered Gao towards the end of the 13th century. Gao would remain under Malian hegemony until the late 14th century. As the Mali Empire started to disintegrate, the Songhai reasserted control of Gao. Songhai rulers subsequently took advantage of the weakened Mali Empire to expand Songhai rule.

Under the rule of Sonni Ali, the Songhai surpassed the Malian Empire in area, wealth, and power, absorbing vast areas of the Mali Empire and reached its greatest extent. His son and successor, Sonni Bāru (1492–1493), was a less successful ruler of the empire, and as such was overthrown by Muhammad Ture (1493–1528; called Askia), one of his father's generals, who instituted political and economic reforms throughout the empire.

A series of plots and coups by Askia's successors forced the empire into a period of decline and instability. Askia's relatives attempted to govern the empire, but political chaos and several civil wars within the empire ensured the empire's continued decline, particularly during the brutal rule of Askia Ishaq I (1539–1549). The empire experienced a period of stability and a string of military successes during the reign of Askia Daoud (1549–1582/1583).

Askia Ishaq II (1588–1591) ascended to power in a long dynastic struggle following the death of Askia Daoud. He would be the last ruler of the Songhai Empire, for in 1590, al-Mansur took advantage of the recent civil strife in the empire and sent an army under the command of Judar Pasha to conquer the Songhai and to gain control of the Trans-Saharan trade routes. After the disastrous defeat at the Battle of Tondibi (1591), the Songhai Empire collapsed.

History

Pre-imperial Songhai 

The Songhai Empire replaced Mali as the most important empire in West Africa (covering the modern states of Niger, Mali, Mauritania, Senegal, Nigeria, Guinea, Gambia, Algeria (south), Burkina-Faso, and Côte d'Ivoire). Beginning as a smaller kingdom along the eastern side of the Niger river, the Songhai would expand their territory dramatically from the reign of King Sunni Ali (1464-1492). In ancient times there were several different groups of people that collectively formed the Songhai identity. Among the first people to settle in the region of Gao were the Sorko people, who established small settlements on the banks of the Niger River. The Sorko fashioned boats and canoes from the wood of the cailcedrat tree and fished and hunted from their boats and provided water-borne transport for goods and people. Another group of people that moved into the area to live off of Niger's resources were the Gao people. The Gao were hunters and specialized in hunting river animals such as crocodile and hippopotamus.

The other group of people known to have inhabited the area were the Do people. They were farmers who raised crops in the fertile lands bordering the river. Sometime before the 10th century, these early settlers were subjugated by more powerful, horse-riding Songhai speakers, who established control over the area. All these groups of people gradually began to speak the same language and they and their country eventually became known as the Songhai.

Early royalty 

The earliest dynasty of kings is obscure and most of the information about this dynasty comes from an ancient cemetery near a village called Saney, close to Gao. Inscriptions on a few of the tombstones in the cemetery indicate that this dynasty ruled in the late 11th and early 12th centuries and that the rulers from this dynasty bore the title of Malik (King in Arabic). Other tombstones mention a second dynasty, whose rulers bore the title zuwa. There is only myth and legend to describe zuwa origins. The Tarikh al-Sudan (the History of the Sudan), written in Arabic around 1655, provides an early history of the Songhai as handed down through oral tradition. The Chronicle reports that the legendary founder of the Za or the Zuwa dynasty was called Za Alayaman (also spelled Dialliaman), who originally came from Yemen and settled in the town of Kukiya. What happened to the Zuwa rulers is not recorded.

Pre-imperial kingdom 

The Sanhaja tribes were among the early people of the Niger bend region. They were locally known as the Tuareg. These tribes rode out of the great Sahara Desert and established trading settlements near the Niger. As time passed, North African traders crossed the Sahara and joined the Tuaregs in their Niger bend settlements. They all conducted business with the people living near the river. As trade in the region increased, the Songhai chiefs took control of the profitable commerce around what was to later become Gao. Between 750 and 950, as the Ghana Empire prospered as the "land of gold" far to the west, the trading centre at Gao became an increasingly important terminus for trade across the Sahara.

The trade goods included gold, salt, slaves, kola nuts, leather, dates, and ivory. And by the 10th century, the Songhai chiefs had established Gao as a small kingdom, taking control of the people living along the trade routes. At around 1300, Gao had become so prosperous that it attracted the attention of the Mali Empire and its rulers. Gao was subsequently conquered by them and Mali profited from Gao's trade and collected taxes from its kings until about the 1430s. Troubles in the Mali homelands made it impossible to maintain control of Gao. Ibn Battuta visited Gao in 1353 when the town was a part of the Mali Empire. He arrived by boat from Timbuktu on his return journey from visiting the capital of the empire:Then I travelled to the town of Kawkaw, which is a great town on the Nīl [Niger], one of the finest, biggest, and most fertile cities of the Sūdān. There is much rice there, and milk, and chickens, and fish, and the cucumber, which has no like. Its people conduct their buying and selling with cowries, like the people of Mālī.

Imperial Songhai 

Following the death of Mansa Sulayman in 1360, disputes over the succession weakened the Mali Empire. Furthermore, the ruinous reign of Mari Djata II left the empire in bad financial shape, but the empire itself passed intact to Musa II. However, the real power in the empire was in the hands of Mari Djata, Musa's kankoro-sigui. He put down a Tuareg rebellion in Takedda and attempted to quell the Songhai rebellion in Gao. While he was successful in Takedda, he did not manage to re-subjugate Gao, and so the Songhai effectively retained their independence. During his reign, Sonni Ali would be the one to expand the small kingdom of Gao into an enormous empire.

Sunni Ali 

Sunni Ali was the first king of the Songhai Empire and the 15th ruler of the Sunni dynasty. He worked hard to get the Songhai empire past its rocky start. The Muslim leaders of Timbuktu asked him to drive out the invaders. Once Sunni Ali drove them out, he took this chance and took over Timbuktu. Soon, he had almost all the trading cities along the Niger River.

Imperial Songhai
In the decades following the death of Mansa Sulayman, disputes over succession weakened the Mali Empire, and in the 1430s Songhai, previously a Mali dependency, gained independence under the Sonni dynasty. Around thirty years later Sonni Sulayman Dama attacked Méma, the Mali province west of Timbuktu, paving the way for his successor, Sonni Ali, to turn his country into one of the greatest empires of medieval Africa.

Sonni Ali
Sonni Ali reigned from 1464 to 1492, after the death of Sulayman Dama. Like Songhai kings before him, Ali was a Muslim. In the late 1460s, he conquered many of the Songhai's neighboring states, including what remained of the Mali Empire. Sonni Ali was considered the empire's most formidable military strategist and conqueror.

During his campaigns for expansion, Ali conquered many lands, repelling attacks from the Mossi to the south and overcoming the Dogon people of the north. He annexed Timbuktu in 1468, after Islamic leaders of the town requested his assistance in overthrowing marauding Tuaregs who had taken the city following the decline of Mali. However, Ali met stark resistance after setting his eyes on the wealthy and renowned trading town of Djenné (also known as Jenne). After a persistent seven-year siege, he was able to forcefully incorporate it into his vast empire in 1473, but only after having starved its citizens into surrender.

The invasion of Sonni Ali and his forces caused harm to the city of Timbuktu, and he was described as an intolerant tyrant in many muslim accounts such as the Tarikh al-fattash which was written by Mahmud Kati who was a notable ally of the succeeding Askia Muhammad I. According to The Cambridge History of Africa the Islamic historian Al-Sa'di expresses this sentiment in describing his incursion on Timbuktu:

Sonni Ali conducted a repressive policy against the scholars of Timbuktu, especially those of the Sankore region who were associated with the Tuareg. With his control of critical trade routes and cities such as Timbuktu, Sonni Ali brought great wealth to the Songhai Empire, which at its height would surpass the wealth of Mali.

In oral tradition, Sonni Ali is often known as a powerful politician and great military commander. Whatever the case may have been, his legend consists of him being a fearless conqueror who united a great empire, sparking a legacy that is still intact today. Under his reign Djenné and Timbuktu became great centers of learning.

Askia the Great

After taking the throne Muhammad is known as Askia the Great, even though he had no real right to be the king. Not only was he not in the royal family blood line, he did not hold the sacred symbols which entitled one to become a ruler. Furthermore, he was most likely a descendant of sohankey songhay wizard lineage not Soninke lineage, wakorey it's Soninke people name in songhay language. But Askia managed to bypass that law and take the throne.

He organized the territories that Sonni Ali had previously conquered and extended his power as far to the south and east. The army of the Songhai Empire under the Askia Mohammad I (1493 - 1528) possessed a full-time core of warriors. Al-Sa'di, the chronicler who wrote the Tarikh al-Sudan compared Askiya Mohammad I's army to that of his predecessor;"he distinguished between the civilian and the army unlike Sunni Ali [1464–92] when everyone was a soldier."Askia Mohammad I is said to have possessed cynical attitudes towards kingdoms that lacked professional armies like his. He was not as tactful as Ali in the means of the military, but he did find success in alliances. Because of these alliances he was able to capture and conquer more vastly. Unlike Ali, however, he was a devout Muslim. Askia opened religious schools, constructed mosques, and opened up his court to scholars and poets from throughout the Muslim world. He sent his children to an Islamic School and enforced Islamic practices. Yet he was tolerant of other religions and did not force Islam on his people.

Like Mansa Musa, Askia also completed one of the Five Pillars of Islam by taking a hajj to Mecca, and, also like the former, went with an overwhelming amount of gold. He donated some to charity and used the rest for lavish gifts to impress the people of Mecca with the wealth of the Songhai. Islam was so important to him that, upon his return, he recruited Muslim scholars from Egypt and Morocco to teach at the Sankore Mosque in Timbuktu as well as setting up many other learning centers throughout his empire. His pilgrimage was much less noteworthy to Cairene historians than that of Mansa Musa; they noted it consisted of "an escort of 500 cavalry and 1000 infantry, and with him he carried 300,000 pieces of gold". Among his great accomplishments was an interest in astronomical knowledge which led to a flourishing of astronomers and observatories in the capital.

While not as renowned as his predecessor for his military tactics, he initiated many campaigns, notably declaring Jihad against the neighboring Mossi. Even after subduing them he did not force them to convert to Islam. His army consisted of war canoes, expert cavalry, protective armor, iron tipped weapons, and an organized militia.

Not only was he a patron of Islam, he also was gifted in administration and encouraging trade. He centralized the administration of the empire and established an efficient bureaucracy which was responsible for, among other things, tax collection and the administration of justice. He also demanded that canals be built in order to enhance agriculture, which would eventually increase trade. More important than anything he did for trade was the introduction of weights and measures and the appointment of an inspector for each of Songhai's important trading centers. During his reign Islam became more widely entrenched, trans-Saharan trade flourished, and the Saharan salt mines of Taghaza were brought within the boundaries of the empire.

Decline 
As Askia the Great grew older, his power declined. In 1528 his sons revolted against him and declared Musa, one of Askia's many sons, as king. Following Musa's overthrow in 1531, Songhai's empire went into decline. Following multiple attempts at governing the Empire by Askia's sons and grandsons there was little hope for a return to the power it once held.

Between the political chaos and multiple civil wars within the empire, it came as a surprise when Morocco invaded Songhai unexpectedly. The main reason for the Moroccan invasion of Songhai was to seize control of and revive the trans-Saharan trade in salt and gold. The Songhai military, during Askia's reign, consisted of full-time soldiers, but the king never modernized his army. On the other hand, the invading Moroccan army included thousands of arquebusiers and eight English cannons. In the decisive Battle of Tondibi on 13 March 1591, the Moroccans destroyed the entire Songhai army and proceeded to capture Gao and Timbuktu, marking the end of the empire.

Provinces
The original Songhai only included the region of Timbuktu to the east of Gao, the provinces were created after a massive military expansion of Songhai under the emperors Sunni Ali Ber and askiya who made the small territory heir to the Gao Empire one of the largest contiguous land empire spanning West Africa, part of North Africa and Central Africa from the Atlantic to the lake chad Basin and Algerian Sahara to the Guinean forest.  
This vast territory was controlled from the three central military provinces which are :

The kurmina where resided the Balama minister of defense of the Empire and general-in-chief of the armies in charge of military surveillance of the western provinces including Mali, the western garrisons are stationed there, the balama resides with part of the naval fleet in port of kabara, the other important personality is the kurmina Fari where kanfari who acts as governors and resides in Timbuktu, the provincial capital.

The capital province of Gao where the emperor resided with the central garrisons and part of the fleet commanded by the Hikoy the Admiral of the empire stationed at the port of Gao with more than 1000 ships at the time of the askia. It was where all the great military campaigns started. The emperor is assisted in his military province in the south by the Tondi farma governor of the province of Hombori in charge of the southern regions and in the north by the Surgukoy, the Amenokal of Tademekat and chief of the Berbers in charge of the Saharan provinces and possessing an Camel cavalry army.

The eastern province of Dendi led by the Dendifari the provincial governor where part of the military garrisons was stationed in charge of the surveillance of the eastern provinces including the Hausa kingdoms. The fleet was stationed at the port of Ayorou.

The provinces of the Songhai Empire are:

Kourmina
Bara
Dendi
Dirma
Bargou
Hombori
Aribinda
Aïr (Agadez)
Mali
Senegambia
Hausa kingdoms
Mossi
Wagadou
Aoukar (Oualata)
Tademekat
Takrur
Diarra
south Algeria
Kaabu

A Diminished Songhai Empire
After the defeat of the Empire, the nobles moved south in an area known today as Songhai in present Niger where the Sonni dynasty had already settled and formed various smaller kingdoms namely, Wanzarbe, Ayerou Gothèye, Dargol, Téra, Sikié, Kokorou, Gorouol, Karma, Namaro etc and further south, the Dendi which rose to prominence shortly after.

Culture
At its peak, the Songhai City of Timbuktu became a thriving cultural and commercial center. Arab, Italian, and Jewish merchants all gathered for trade. A revival of Islamic scholarship also took place at the university in Timbuktu. It acquired a reputation for learning and scholarship across the Muslim world. However, Timbuktu was but one of a myriad of cities throughout the empire.

Economy

External overland trade in the Sahel and internal riverine trade along the Niger were the primary sources of Songhai wealth. Sea-borne trade along the West African coast was not possible until the late 1400s. Several dykes were constructed during the reign of Sonni Ali. This enhanced the irrigation and agricultural yield of Songhai.

Overland trade was fostered by four factors: "camels provided the transportation, Berber tribesmen ensured the source of provisions [along the trade routes], Islam provided some internal cohesion as well as an ideological link with other people in the Sahel, and the imperial structure supplied the politico-military organization that mandated and safeguarded the available resources." Gold was readily available in West Africa, but salt was not - it was rare but essential for human survival. So, the gold-salt trade was the backbone of overland trade routes in the Sahel. On the back of this trade, ivory, ostrich feathers, and slaves were sent north in exchange for salt, horses, camels, cloth, and art. While there were many trade routes in use to varying degrees, the route through the Fezzan via Bilma, Agades, and Gao was heavily used by the empire.

The Niger river was an essential artery for trade for the empire. Goods would be offloaded from camels onto either donkeys or boats at Timbuktu. From there, they'd move along a 500-mile corridor upstream to Djenné or downstream to Gao.

The Julla (merchants) would form partnerships, and the state would protect these merchants and the port cities of the Niger. It was a very strong trading kingdom, known for its production of practical crafts as well as religious artifacts.  A universal system of weights and measures throughout the empire was implemented by Askia Muhammad I.

The Songhai economy was based on a clan system. The clan a person belonged to ultimately decided one's occupation. The most common were metalworkers, fishermen, and carpenters. Lower caste participants consisted of mostly non-farm working immigrants, who at times were provided special privileges and held high positions in society. At the top were noblemen and direct descendants of the original Songhai people, followed by freemen and traders. At the bottom were war captives and slaves obligated to labor, especially in farming. The Songhai used slaves more consistently than their predecessors, the Ghana and Mali empires. For example, a large landed estate worked by slaves "in the bend of the Niger ... was solely to supply the needs of the administration and the army." James Olson describes the labor system as resembling modern day unions, with the Empire possessing craft guilds that consisted of various mechanics and artisans.

Criminal justice
Criminal justice in Songhai was based mainly, if not entirely, on Islamic principles, especially during the rule of Askia Muhammad. The local qadis were in addition to this, with their responsibility being to maintain order by following Sharia law under Islamic domination, according to the Qur'an. An additional qadi was noted as a necessity in order to settle minor disputes between immigrant merchants. Kings usually did not judge a defendant; however, under special circumstances, such as acts of treason, they felt an obligation to do so and thus exert their authority. Results of a trial were announced by the "town crier" and punishment for most trivial crimes usually consisted of confiscation of merchandise or even imprisonment, since various prisons existed throughout the Empire.

Qadis worked at the local level and were positioned in important trading towns, such as Timbuktu and Djenné.
The Qadi was appointed by the king and dealt with common-law misdemeanors according to Sharia law. The Qadi also had the power to grant a pardon or offer refuge. The Assara-munidios, or "enforcers" worked along the lines of a police commissioner whose sole duty was to execute sentencing. Jurists were mainly composed of those representing the academic community; professors were often noted as taking administrative positions within the Empire and many aspired to be qadis.

Government
The upper classes in society converted to Islam while lower classes often continued to follow traditional religions. Sermons emphasized obedience to the king. Timbuktu was the educational capital. Sonni Ali established a system of government under the royal court, later to be expanded by Askia Muhammad, which appointed governors and mayors to preside over local tributary states, situated around the Niger Valley. Local chiefs were still granted authority over their respective domains as long as they did not undermine Songhai policy. Departmental positions existed in the central government. The hi koy was the commander of the fleet who performed roles likened to a minister of home affairs. Fari Mondzo was the minister of agriculture who administered over the state's agricultural estates. The Kalisa farma has been described by historians such as Ki-Zerbo to be the finance minister who supervised the empire's treasury. The Korey Farma was also the "minister in charge of White foreigners."

The tax was imposed on peripheral chiefdoms and provinces to ensure the dominance of Songhai, and in return, these provinces were given almost complete autonomy. Songhai rulers only intervened in the affairs of these neighboring states when a situation became volatile, usually an isolated incident. Each town was represented by government officials, holding positions and responsibilities similar to today's central bureaucrats.

Under Askia Muhammad, the Empire saw increased centralization. He encouraged learning in Timbuktu by rewarding its professors with larger pensions as an incentive. He also established an order of precedence and protocol and was noted as a noble man who gave back generously to the poor. Under his policies, Muhammad brought much stability to Songhai and great attestations of this noted organization are still preserved in the works of Maghrebin writers such as Leo Africanus, among others.

Religion 
The Sonni dynasty practiced Islam while maintaining many aspects of the original Songhai traditions unlike their successors, the Askiyas. Askia Mohammed I oversaw a complete Islamic revival and made a pilgrimage to Mecca.

Military 

The Songhai army owes its composition and its organization to Sunni Ali Ber and included a Navy created by Sunni Ali Ber and led by an Admiral the hikoy, a simple Cavalry, Mounted archer, an Infantry, a Camel cavalry. If in asia the elephants were used by the armies to charge the enemy, the songhai used herds of bulls with long horns raised in the imperial stables and put in fury to charge the enemy camp during the battle, vultures were also raised for harass the enemy and reign terror in the enemy camps. the emperor was the strategist and the commander-in-chief of the armies but the balama acts as minister of defense and general of the armies he is followed by the general of the army corps, the jinakoy, followed by wonkoy , the lieutenants leading a garrison, the tongo farma is the head of the archers, the Hikoy admiral of the navy residing in the port of Gao is the second personality of the empire and also the Minister of the interior, he is assisted by 2 vice admirals residing in the port of kabara for one and at the port of Ayorou for the other and commander of more than a thousand captains ensuring the rapid movement of troops on the Niger river and the assault on the islands and towns of the river, a landing port is set up in Oualata by Sunni Ali ber with the Sunni Ali ber Canal dug by the emperor and connecting the port of kabara to Oualata, only the Malian part remains, the rest which continues to Oualata is buried by the Sahara after the fall of the empire. The infantry is led by an infantry general, the nyay hurey (war elephant). the cavalry called gu is led by a cavalry chief , the gukoy. the camel cavery is mainly made up of Berbers recruited in the northern provinces and led by the amenokal of Tademekat in the event of general war. The songhai included three military provinces which each had an army stationed there and was divided into several garrisons, the kurmina led by the balama, the central province by the emperor himself and the dendi by the dendi fari. the army of the military provinces which was in the direction of the military operation was mobilized with that of the emperor and those remaining on the spot ensured order in the three provinces, the emperor had an obligation to be in front of the armed during a war of conquest. The jinakoy ruled secondary provinces and their lieutenants the regions of the provinces. According to Potholm, the Songhai army was dominated by heavy cavalry of "mounted knights outfitted in chain mail and helmets" similar to medieval European armies. The Infantry included a force made up of mostly freemen and captives. Swords, arrows and copper or leather shields formed part of the arsenal utilized by the Songhai infantry. At the Battle of Tondibi for example, the Songhai army consisted of 30,000 infantry and a 10,000 cavalry force.

Defeat

Following the death of Emperor Askia Daoud in 1583, a war of succession weakened the Songhai Empire and split it into two feuding fractions, leading Sultan Ahmad I al-Mansur of the Saadi dynasty of Morocco in 1591 to dispatch an invasion force under the eunuch Judar Pasha. (Years earlier, armies from Portugal had attacked Morocco, and failed miserably, but the Moroccan coffers were on the verge of economic depletion and bankruptcy, as they needed to pay for the defenses used to hold off the siege).

Judar Pasha was a Spaniard by birth, but had been captured as an infant and educated at the Saadi court. After a march across the Sahara desert, Judar's forces captured, plundered, and razed the salt mines at Taghaza and moved on to Gao. When Emperor Askia Ishaq II (r. 1588–1591) met Judar at the 1591 Battle of Tondibi, Songhai forces, despite vastly superior numbers, were routed by a cattle stampede triggered by the Saadi's gunpowder weapons.

Judar proceeded to sack Gao, Timbuktu and Djenné, destroying the Songhai as a regional power. Governing so vast an empire proved too much for the Saadi dynasty, however, and they soon relinquished control of the region, letting it splinter into dozens of smaller kingdoms.

List of Rulers
Names and Dates taken from John Stewart's African States and Rulers (2005).

Songhai Dias (Kings)

Songhai Sunnis (Sheikhs)

Songhai Emperors

Songhai Emperors (ruled in Exile from Dendi)

See also
 Za dynasty
 Sonni dynasty
 Askiya dynasty
 Saadi dynasty
 Mali Empire
 Dendi Kingdom
 Songhai languages
 Songhai country
 Songhai proper

References

Citations

Sources 

 
 
 
 
 
 
 
 (reprint: Markus Wiener, Princeton, 2000).

Further reading 

 Isichei, Elizabeth. A History of African Societies to 1870. Cambridge: Cambridge University Press, 1997. Print.
 Shillington, Kevin. History of Africa . 2nd . NY: Macmillan, 2005. Print.
 Cissoko, S. M., Timbouctou et l'empire songhay, Paris 1975.
 Lange, D., Ancient Kingdoms of West Africa, Dettelbach 2004 (the book has a chapter titled "The Mande factor in Gao history", pp. 409–544).
 Gomez, Michael A., African Dominion: A New History of Empire in Early and Medieval West Africa. Princeton University Press, 2018.

External links

 The Story of Africa: Songhay — BBC World Service
 Askiyah's Questions and al-Maghili's Answers is an essay about the rule of the Songhai Empire from the 15th century. 

 
1591 disestablishments in Africa
Former empires in Africa
Ancient peoples
History of Africa
States and territories established in 1464
15th-century establishments in Africa
Sahelian kingdoms
Songhai